Centro de Desenvolvimento Comunitário Manicoré, commonly known as CDC Manicoré, is a Brazilian football club based in Manicoré, Amazonas state.

History
The club was founded on May 30, 2007. They won the Campeonato Amazonense Second Level in 2011, sharing the title with Iranduba and thus being promoted to the 2012 Campeonato Amazonense.

Achievements

 Campeonato Amazonense Second Level:
 Winners (1): 2011

Stadium
Centro de Desenvolvimento Comunitário Manicoré play their home games at Estádio Flávia de Oliveira, nicknamed Bacurauzão. The stadium has a maximum capacity of 3,500 people.

References

Association football clubs established in 2007
Football clubs in Amazonas (Brazilian state)
2007 establishments in Brazil